Stephen Muecke  BA (Hons, Monash), Mes.L (Paris), PhD (UWA) FAHA is Emeritus Professor of Ethnography at the University of New South Wales, Australia and Adjunct Professor at the Nulungu Institute, University of Notre Dame, Broome. He studied linguistics and semiotics, completing his PhD on storytelling techniques among Aboriginal people in Broome, Western Australia.

Publications 
Muecke's PhD research resulted in Gularabulu: Stories from the West Kimberley, Fremantle Arts Centre Press, 1983. The storyteller was Indigenous leader Paddy Roe (OAM). They later collaborated on the prizewinning Reading the Country: Introduction to Nomadology (Fremantle, 1984) with landscape painter Krim Benterrak, a postmodern ethnography of Roebuck Plains, near Broome. A recent book with Paddy Roe is The Children's Country: The Creation of a Goolarabooloo Future in North-West Australia (2020). In 1993 Muecke became the first Professor of Cultural Studies in Australia, at the University of Technology, Sydney, where he worked from 1985 to 2009.

Muecke is a significant proponent of fictocritical writing, the travelogue No Road (bitumen all the way) (Fremantle 1997) being the first Australian monograph in this genre; a later collection is Joe in the Andamans and Other Fictocritical Stories (Local Consumption, 2008). Both books were shortlisted for major literary prizes.

With Adam Shoemaker he edited the writings of David Unaipon, Legendary Tales of the Australian Aborigines (Melbourne University Press, 2001), and co-edited with Jack Davis and Mudrooroo Narogin the first anthology of Black Australian writings, Paperbark: A Collection of Black Australian Writings, (University of QLD Press, 1990).  He identified that the book Myths and Legends of the Aborigines by William Ramsay Smith was actually mainly written by Unaipon. Again with Adam Shoemaker, he co-authored a book about Aboriginal Australians entitled  (2002), which was published in the French collection “Découvertes Gallimard”. The English edition, Aboriginal Australians: First Nations of an Ancient Continent, appeared in 2004, published by Thames & Hudson.

Cultural Studies research on the Indian Ocean from 2000 has led to Cultures of Trade, edited with Devleena Ghosh (Cambridge Scholars, 2007), and a collaborative work with the photographer Max Pam, Contingency in Madagascar (Intellect, 2012).

Personal life 

Muecke is a descendant of pioneering Germans in the Barossa Valley and Adelaide, and he is the father of three sons, Joe, Hugo and Sebastian with his partner Prudence Black. They live in Adelaide and Sydney, Australia. His sister, Frances Muecke, is a retired classicist at the University of Sydney.

References

External links 
https://hal.arts.unsw.edu.au/about-us/people/stephen-muecke/
http://www.nla.gov.au/openpublish/index.php/ras/article/download/205/242
 https://web.archive.org/web/20110706101952/http://berkelouw.com.au/browse/all/by/Stephen-Muecke

Linguists from Australia
Living people
Academic staff of the University of New South Wales
Academic staff of the University of Technology Sydney
People from Sydney
Year of birth missing (living people)